Franz Leuninger (28 December 18981 March 1945) was a German trade unionist, politician and resistant against the Nazis' rise to power and regime. Working as a bricklayer after school, he became a member of the trade union for construction workers early on, serving as its regional leader in Silesia in the 1920s. He was a member of the city council of Breslau for the Zentrumspartei from 1930, and ran for the German Reichstag in 1933, as a strong opponent of the Nazi party. 

After the 20 July 1944 plot to assassinate Hitler, he was arrested as one of the personalities planned for leading positions in a new beginning. Months later, he was sentenced to death and executed. He is remembered as a man who sacrificed his life consciously, based on his Christian faith, to fight against an unjust regime. He was introduced as a martyr of the 20th century by the Catholic Church, and a school and streets were named after him.

Early life and career
Leuninger was born in Mengerskirchen in the Westerwald region, the third of nine children of the farmer and smith Weinand Leuninger and his wife Elisabeth. He was raised with a strong Christian background, laying the foundation for his belief in human rights such as dignity and freedom of conscience (Menschenwürde und Gewissensfreiheit). After elementary school, despite his abilities, the family could not afford to enroll him in higher education. He took jobs in building farm roads in his hometown, then, not even 14 years old,  helping one of his brothers in construction work in Remscheid. He then worked as a bricklayer in the Siegerland region. In the winter season, when construction stopped, he assisted his father in smithing.

During the First World War, he was drafted and served until the end of the war. He ended the war with the rank of Unteroffizier. Afterwards, he worked as bricklayer in the Aachen region. He joined a Christian trade union for construction workers early on,  the Christlicher Bauarbeiterverband, a subdivision of Christian trade unions. He became its local secretary in Aachen in 1922. In 1924, he married Anna Paulina Meuser in Mengerskirchen. He rose to district secretary, and worked in the same function in Euskirchen. He was then called to service in Krefeld, where the couple moved into a first apartment together, and three sons were born, Franz, Walter and Herbert. From 1927, not even 30 years old, he led the trade union in Breslau where he was responsible for Silesia. He was a member of the Deutsche Zentrumspartei, elected to the city council of Breslau in 1930. In March 1933, he ran for the German Reichstag; in his campaign, he was a strong opponent of the Nazi party. He warned urgently of the consequences of them taking over the government, foreseeing the damage to the trade unions in particular, and democracy, justice and freedom in general. He said in an election meeting in 1932 that all present would lose their homeland (Heimat) if Hitler came to power.  Some were irritated by the combination of union manager and Zentrumspartei, but Leuninger clarified that his sense for justice would demand him to stay faithful to the interests of workers even against party interests.

Under the Nazis
After the Nazis came to power, free trade unions were banned, and Leuninger was laid off. After being unemployed for a short time, he took over the management of a non-profit housing association (Siedlungsgesellschaft) called Deutsches Heim (German home), for which he had already worked voluntarily. In this position, he was able to offer jobs to people who criticized the regime. He came into contact with the resistance groups around Carl Goerdeler, the mayor of Leipzig, Ludwig Beck, the Army's Chief of General Staff and a leader in the anti-Hitler resistance,   and the Christian trade unionist Jakob Kaiser.

In World War II, Leuninger was drafted to serve in the army in the Invasion of Poland. He wrote in a letter to his brother stating "There is nothing that justifies war, and all means are permitted to prevent a war. After the failure of the assassination attempt on Hitler on 20 July 1944, Leuninger was arrested on 26 September, accused of not having reported the peace negotiations of which he was aware. This was a crime of high treason under the penal code of the time. He remained in custody for several months, while his wife escaped to the West, and their sons were drafted. He was tried by the People's Court on 28 February 1945. He was sentenced to death, and executed the following day on 1 March 1945 in Plötzensee Prison in Berlin, at the age of 46. In a sermon in an ecumenical memorial service at the site on 20 July 1999, Karl Meyer said that Leuninger walked to his execution singing psalms.

Leuninger belonged to those killed when the end of the war was already near. , who was in prison with him, wrote: "He lived the last days with admirable strength, which can only be explained by his deep Christian faith ... Franz Leuninger was a man who sacrificed his life for us and for his fatherland with great awareness and clear will." ("Mit bewundernswerter, nur aus seinem tief-christlichen Glauben erklärlichen Stärke hat er die letzten Tage  gelebt ... Franz Leuninger war ein Mensch, der sein Leben ganz bewusst und klaren Willens für uns und für sein Vaterland geopfert hat.")

Memorial 

, commissioned by the German Bishops' Conference to produce the work, memorialized those who died for their Christian ideals as victims of violence (Gewaltopfer). Moll spoke in Remscheid on 23 October 2016, opening an exhibition at  commemorating Leuninger and two others related to Remscheid, Sister Francis van den Berg and the priest .

Biographer Günter Buchstab gave a brief portrait of Leuninger as a deeply religious Catholic, who understood Christianity as an entailing an obligation to show solidarity with his fellow men. According to Buchstab, as a trade unionist, Leuninger fought tenaciously and courageously for a more just social order, for the improvement of the situation of the construction workers he represented and their families and as a patriot and upright democrat, he was a determined opponent of political extremism.

The primary school of his birthplace Mengerskirchen in the Limburg-Weilburg district has been  named after him. A street near Berlin's Plötzensee Prison, where he was judicially murdered,  was named Leuningerpfad after him in 1962, as was in 1984 a street in Hannover's Wettbergen suburb.

References

Cited sources

Further reading 
  (edited on behalf of the German Bishops' Conference), Zeugen für Christus. Das deutsche Martyrologium des 20. Jahrhunderts. 6th extended and restructured edition, Paderborn among others, 2015, vol. I, 425–429.

External links 
 
 
 Leuninger, Franz Hessische Biografie.
 
 Remembrance in the City pfad-der-erinnerung.berlin

1898 births
1945 deaths
People from Limburg-Weilburg
Centre Party (Germany) politicians
Executed members of the 20 July plot
People executed by Nazi Germany by hanging
Christian martyrs
German resistance to Nazism
Roman Catholics in the German Resistance
German Army personnel of World War I